Idyros was a Greek city in ancient Lycia. Its exact location is uncertain. According to Pseudo-Scylax it was located north of Phaselis. 

The site of the town is tentatively located near modern Kemer.

References 

Greek colonies in Anatolia
Archaeological sites in Antalya Province
Ancient Greek archaeological sites in Turkey
Former populated places in Turkey
Populated places in ancient Lycia
Kemer District